Andrew Stewart Perloff is the chairman and majority owner of British property company Panther Securities. In 2015, Perloff launched a takeover bid for the Beales department store chain.

In 2014, Hertfordshire Life magazine list him on its Rich List at number 42, with an estimated net worth of £44 million.

References 

Living people
Year of birth missing (living people)
English businesspeople

External links 
Panther Securities website